The National Parliamentary Library of Georgia (sakartvelos p'arlament'is erovnuli bibliotek'a) is a governmental organization under the Parliament of Georgia. It is the main book depository of Georgia, as well as the most important cultural, educational, scientific, informational and methodological centre.

History

The history of National Parliamentary Library of Georgia begins from 1846 when "Tiflis Public Library” was founded on the base of the Office of the Governor General of Tbilisi. By this, the desire of the Georgian society to have a library available for all levels of society was fulfilled. In 1848 the Public Library received the funds of "Private Associated Library” established on the initiative of the prominent public figure Dimitri Kipiani.

By 1859 the fund of the Public Library had consisted of 13.260 volumes in 19 languages. As the funds grew, the building of the Office could not meet the requirements any more, and in 1851 the new building was built. In 1852 the Library was granted the right to receive two free copies of all publications printed in Caucasus. In 1868 Tiflis Public Library and the Caucasus Museum were united, and in 1913 Tiflis Public Library was transformed into the Scientific Library of the Caucasus Museum and was completely united with the latter.

In 1914 the library was closed due to constructing a new building for the Caucasus Museum. The funds of the library were packed in the boxes and kept in the basement for ten years. The National Parliamentary Library of Georgia building #1 was built as the Bank of Nobility in 1913-16 by architect Anatoly Kalgin and artist Henryk Hryniewski.

On 30 May 1923, on the base of the Tiflis Public Library and Parliamentary Library, the State Public Library of Georgia was founded. In 1937 the library obtained the funds of the library of the Society for Dissemination of Literacy among Georgians, which was active in 1880–1927, that made it the most complete collection of the national printed materials. In 1957 the library joined international book exchange network. In 1989 the library purchased its first personal computer, and since 1990 the digital catalogues have been created.

From 1955 till 1990 the library was functioning under the name of "State Republic Library”; in 1990 it was granted the name "National Library of Georgia”. On 25 December 1996 it passed under control of Parliament of Georgia, and now its official name is "National Parliamentary Library of Georgia” (NPLG). In 2000 it was named after Ilia Chavchavadze, the great Georgian literary and public figure, widely regarded as one of the founding fathers of modern Georgia.

Since 1991 the NPLG is a member of the International Federation of Library Associations and Institutions (IFLA).

In 2015 a video of a security guard named Omar Tsereteli playing the piano piece "Giorni dispari" by Ludovico Einaudi at the building gained international attention.

References

External links

 
Digital Library 

Libraries in Tbilisi
Legislative libraries
Georgia
Government buildings in Georgia (country)
Libraries established in 1846
1840s establishments in Georgia (country)
1846 establishments in Asia
1846 establishments in the Russian Empire
Library buildings completed in 1851
Library buildings completed in 1923
1923 establishments in Georgia (country)